Dhimitër Ilo (8 March 1862 - 1947) was an Albanian patriot from Korçë, then in the Ottoman Empire. He was a delegate from the Albanian community of Romania during the Albanian Declaration of Independence.

References

20th-century Albanian politicians
19th-century Albanian politicians
Eastern Orthodox Christians from Albania
1947 deaths
1862 births
People from Korçë
Albanian expatriates in Romania
People from Manastir vilayet
All-Albanian Congress delegates